Judith Marilyn Spiers (born 15 March 1953) is a British radio and television presenter.

Career
Initially training to be an actress at the Rose Bruford College, Spiers began her broadcasting career at Westward Television in 1977, then the ITV station for south-west England. She impressed in the birthday slot with Gus Honeybun with cheeky humour. In short order, she moved to the What's Ahead entertainment guide. She hosted local beauty contests Mr TSW and Miss TSW, reflecting the new south-west station TSW TSW produced a nationally networked daytime chat show Judi!, which ran for six editions.

Eventually, Spiers moved to national television, as a presenter on BBC One's daily magazine programme Pebble Mill from October 1991 until August 1994. In 1995 she co-hosted The Alternative DJ with Peter Jeffrey and Oliver Senton. She also hosted a Saturday show on BBC Radio 2 between 1994 and 1998. Spiers continued to work for TVS, presenting the networked show Scavenger Hunt.

Spiers presented the morning show on BBC Radio Devon from 2005 until 2015.

References

External links 

Judi Spiers on Boom Radio

1953 births
English radio personalities
English television personalities
Living people
Alumni of Rose Bruford College
Mass media people from Plymouth, Devon
BBC Radio 2 presenters